Aunay-les-Bois is a commune in the Orne department in northwestern France. It is notable for its Karting racetrack, which hosts rounds of the CIK-FIA Karting European Championship.

Population

See also
Communes of the Orne department
Parc naturel régional Normandie-Maine

References

Communes of Orne